Known as Taylor's bow-fingered gecko, four-striped forest gecko and marbled bent-toed gecko, (Cyrtodactylus quadrivirgatus)  is a species of gecko found in Thailand, Malaysia, Singapore and Indonesia.

References

External links
 Flickr photo by Kurt (Orionmystery) G, from Selangor, Malaysia
 Flickr photo by Camillenoir

Reptiles of Thailand
Reptiles of Malaysia
Reptiles of Indonesia
Reptiles of Singapore
Cyrtodactylus
Reptiles described in 1962